Volvocisporiaceae is a fungal family in the class Exobasidiomycetes.  The family contains the single genus Volvocisporium, which in turn contains the single species Volvocisporium triumfetticola, found on the leaves of Triumfetta rhomboidea in India.

References

Ustilaginomycotina
Monotypic Basidiomycota genera
Fungus families
Taxa named by Franz Oberwinkler
Taxa described in 2001